The 2009 Grey Power Players' Championship was the last Grand Slam event of both the World Curling Tour and Women's World Curling Tour for the 2008-09 season. This was the seventeenth time the event has taken place, and the fourth time since it was switched to joint men's/women's format. The event was held in Grande Prairie, Alberta April 14-19. Since the event was a part of the Olympic qualifying process in Canada, only Canadian teams were invited. The total purse for each event is $100,000.

Edmonton's Randy Ferbey won the men's event securing a spot for his rink at the 2009 Canadian Olympic Curling Trials.  On the women's side, Winnipeg's Jennifer Jones rink won their third Players' title.

Men's event

Teams

Results

A event

B event

C event

Playoffs

Women's event

Teams

Results

A event

B event

C event

Playoffs

Notes

References

April 2009 sports events in Canada
2009 in Alberta
Players Championships, 2009
Sport in Grande Prairie
Curling competitions in Alberta
Players' Championship